María Teresa López may refer to:

 María Teresa López Beltrán (1950–2012), Spanish historian and medievalist
 María Teresa López Boegeholz (1927–2006), Chilean oceanographer
  (1928–2003), birth name María Teresa López González, Spanish novelist